In the United States, a senior military college (SMC) is one of six colleges that offer military Reserve Officers' Training Corps (ROTC) programs under , though many other schools offer military Reserve Officers' Training Corps under other sections of the law.  The six senior military colleges are:
The Citadel, in Charleston, South Carolina
Norwich University, in Northfield, Vermont
Texas A&M University, in College Station, Texas
Virginia Military Institute, in Lexington, Virginia
Virginia Tech, in Blacksburg, Virginia
University of North Georgia, in Dahlonega, Georgia

Criteria

Army ROTC
Under Army regulation an SMC must meet certain criteria:

Bachelor's degree must be granted.
All physically fit undergraduate students must take courses in military training. Exceptions to this requirement include foreign nationals, prior-service personnel, females not participating in ROTC, and other students approved professor of military science.
The school must establish a corps of cadets in which all cadets wear military uniforms when on campus. The corps of cadets involves a military environment in which the students live constantly, not just during the school day, and in which the students are subject to military discipline.
The SMC must have as an objective the development of character through military training and the regulation of cadet conduct according to principles of military discipline (a cadet code of conduct).
The SMC must maintain military standards similar to those of the federal service academies.

Federal law currently prohibits the Department of Defense from requiring a policy in SMCs that mandates female students' participation in the ROTC programs.

Cadets at an SMC are authorized to take the ROTC program all four years, but taking a commission upon graduation remains optional, unlike other colleges where ROTC cadets are required to sign a contract to take commission before entering their final two years.

Under both AR 145-1 and federal law, the ROTC programs at the senior military colleges are treated differently. Unlike ROTC at other schools, the Department of Defense is prohibited from closing or reducing the ROTC programs at an SMC, even during time of war (full or total mobilization).

The Secretary of Defense and the Secretaries of the military departments may not take or authorize any action to terminate or reduce a unit of the Senior Reserve Officers' Training Corps at a senior military college unless the termination or reduction is specifically requested by the college and Army "[SMC] ROTC programs will continue at an accelerated rate as directed."

In contrast with other colleges and universities: "Under full or total mobilization, the Secretary of the Army may withdraw the ROTC detachments without giving prior notice to the academic institution. The establishment of new SROTC detachments will not be authorized after full mobilization has been declared." All MS-IV cadets at the senior military colleges will be commissioned and directed to attend the proper officers basic course (OBC). At other colleges, ROTC programs will be suspended and the cadet will immediately be available for reassignment.

Another distinction of the SMC system is that all cadets at the senior military colleges are guaranteed active duty commissions when they graduate:

The Secretary of the Army shall ensure that a graduate of a senior military college who desires to serve as a commissioned officer on active duty upon graduation from the college, who is medically and physically qualified for active duty, and who is recommended for such duty by the professor of military science at the college, shall be assigned to active duty.

Naval ROTC

Air Force ROTC

Schools

University of North Georgia
 
The University of North Georgia (UNG), also known as The Military College of Georgia, is located in Dahlonega, Georgia. Since its creation in 1873 as North Georgia Agricultural College, the college required undergraduate resident males to participate in the Corps of Cadets (the corps was optional for resident undergraduate females and all commuting or graduate students). North Georgia was also the first SMC to admit women into the Corps of Cadets. The school has a large United States Army ROTC program and is the only senior military college without Navy/Marine Corps and Air Force programs. Students are no longer required to enroll in the military program.

Norwich University

The Military College of Vermont, The oldest senior military college and the "Birthplace of ROTC", Norwich University is a private university located in Northfield, Vermont. Founded in 1819 at Norwich, Vermont, as the American Literary, Scientific and Military Academy, it is the oldest of the non-federal Military Academies and currently only private military college in the United States. Norwich has often been cited as the inspiration for The Citadel and VMI. It is home to both a corps of cadets and a traditional civilian student population.

Texas A&M University
 
Texas A&M University was established under the Morrill Act of 1862, and cadets began classes in 1876. During World War II, Texas A&M produced 20,229 Aggies who served in combat. Of those, 14,123 Aggies served as officers: more than the combined total of the United States Naval Academy and the United States Military Academy and more than three times the totals of any other SMC.

Texas A&M has grown rapidly since the 20th century and is now the largest university by enrollment in the United States. With an enrollment of 64,961 students, of which approximately 2,560 are cadets, Texas A&M is the largest of the SMCs by total student enrollment. In 2018, more than 220 cadets were commissioned as officers, making Texas A&M University the largest producer of commissioned officers among all the SMCs. According to U.S. News & World Report Texas A&M is ranked highest academically compared to other SMCs, and many degrees common to cadets (specifically STEM degrees) are ranked as top 10 programs out of all universities in the United States. Texas A&M University is the only senior military college to allow students to commission as merchant marines, and is done through their Maritime Academy located at their Galveston campus.

The Citadel

The Citadel, the Military College of South Carolina, is a state-supported, comprehensive college located in Charleston, South Carolina, which was established in 1842. The Citadel enrolls approximately 2,250 cadets in the South Carolina Corps of Cadets and approximately 1,300 civilian graduate and undergraduate students in The Citadel Graduate College. In 2017, for the seventh consecutive year, U.S. News & World Report ranked The Citadel as the No. 1 regional public college in the South (among those that offer master's degrees). Members of the Cadet Corps are required to be enrolled in ROTC and approximately one third are commissioned into the six military services. Active duty Marine and Navy personnel also attend cadet classes as part of the MECEP (Marine Enlisted Commissioning Education Program) and STA-21 programs which commission highly qualified NCOs; the MECEP program originated at The Citadel in 1973.

Virginia Military Institute

Founded in 1839 in Lexington, Virginia, the Virginia Military Institute is the oldest state military college in the United States. VMI has been called the "West Point of the South" because of its role during the Civil War and unlike any other senior military college in the United States, VMI enrolls military cadets only and awards bachelor degrees exclusively. Next to West Point, VMI has graduated more Army generals than any other college or university in the United States of America. The former Governor of Virginia, Ralph Northam, is a graduate of VMI.

In addition to the accomplishments of its graduates in civilian endeavors, VMI is the only military college in the United States to graduate the highest ranking four-star generals across three services:  Two Marine Corps Commandants, Lemuel C. Shepherd, Jr. and Randolph M. Pate, and Chiefs of Staff of the Army, George C. Marshall and the Air Force, John P. Jumper.  VMI is also the only SMC in the United States to graduate a five-star general: General of the Army George C. Marshall.

Virginia Tech

Virginia Polytechnic Institute and State University (Virginia Tech), located in Blacksburg, Virginia, is one of only two major public universities to host a senior military college as part of a larger civilian university. The Corps of Cadets has existed since Virginia Tech's 1872 founding; membership was mandatory for all male students during their entire term at the school until 1924 when the requirement was reduced to two years.  After World War II, prior-service students were not required to enter the Corps, and in 1964 Corps membership was made voluntary for all non-ROTC students.  Women had attended as civilian students since 1921, and they were admitted into the Corps of Cadets in 1973, before the service academies. Members of the Corps may participate in one of two tracks: the Military-Leader Track in one of the three nationally distinguished ROTC programs leading to an officer's commission or the Citizen-Leader Track to serve in the public or private sectors after graduation.

U.S. Coast Guard Direct Commission Selective Schools (DCSS)
Graduates of the six senior military colleges, as well as Mary Baldwin University and Prairie View A&M University, are allowed to commission into the U.S. Coast Guard under the Direct Commission Selective School (DCSS) program.

References

Notes

External links
 Association of Military Colleges and Schools of the United States

Military academies of the United States
+